Craig Cygler, mistakenly named as Greg Figler  in Russian-language sources (born circa 1973, in Woree) is an Australian-born Russian former rugby league footballer, and currently, an entrepreneur and director of the fuel and energy company NQpetro.

Junior Playing Career
Craig began his career at the Kangaroos club, for which he played in 1983-1986 at  junior level.

Senior Playing Career
Cygler began his senior career playing for Cairns Brothers club in 1991 in the u18 division and made his A grade debut in 1992. He was part of the Cairns Brothers premiership winning side of 2000 in the Cairns District Rugby League competition. He played with Cairns Brothers from 1991-2000., beating Kangaroos and scoring a goal. From 1993 to 1995 he played for the Cairns Foley Shield team, and in 1996 made his debut for the Cairns Cyclones in the Queensland Cup.

Representative Playing Career
Cygler became one of seven Australian citizens who, thanks to his Russian heritage, received the right to play for the Russian national side at the 2000 Rugby League World Cup. For Russia, he played two matches in the tournament.

After retirement
He is currently the director of the fuel and energy company NQpetro.

Background
Cygler was born in Woree, Australia.

References

Living people
Australian rugby league players
Russia national rugby league team players
Rugby league centres
People from Queensland
Australian people of Russian descent
1973 births